Asia Ortega Leiva (Barcelona, May 18, 1995) is a Spanish film and television dancer and actress who became known for her participation in the series Les de l'hoquei (2019-2020) as Flor Vilamayor. Later, she starred in the series El internado: Las Cumbres (2021-2022) in the role of Amaia Torres.

Biography

First years 
Asia Ortega Leiva was born on May 18, 1995 in Barcelona (Spain). She is descendant of an Argentinian father, a circus clown by profession, and a Spanish mother and actress. Always rooted in the world of art, she has a great passion for flamenco, so from a very young age she began with this type of dance.

Professional career 
In 2017 she made her film debut with the movie Cuando los ángeles duermen, directed by Gonzalo Bendala and produced by Áralan Films. In 2018 she played Sara, daughter of José Coronado, in the film Tu hijo, directed by Miguel Ángel Vivas and produced by Apache Films. In April 2019 she premiered on TV3 the series Les de l'hoquei, where she played Flor Vilamayor during the two seasons. In addition, she signed for the second season of + de 100 mentiras on  Atresmedia's Flooxer platform

In 2020 she participated in the feature film Malnazidos, directed by Alberto de Toro and Javier Ruiz Caldera. She also starred in Hasta el cielo, a film by Daniel Calparsoro, alongside Miguel Herrán and Carolina Yuste. In 2021 she starred in the series El internado: Las Cumbres, adaptation of the successful Antena 3 El internado: Laguna Negra, where she played Amaia Torres, a conflictive student looking for her boyfriend. After the broadcast of the first season in February 2021, the renewal of the series for a second season was announced, again with Asia as the main character, along with Albert Salazar. In April 2021 she participated episodically in the Netflix series El inocente, playing Cassandra.

In February 2022, it was announced that she would star in the TV series Hasta el cielo on Netflix, based on the 2020 film of the same name, in which she already participated in a supporting role.

Filmography

Cinema

Television

References

External links 
 Asia Ortega on IMDb

Spanish television actresses
Catalan film actors
Spanish film actresses
Living people
1995 births
Spanish people of Argentine descent